The Itch may refer to:

The Itch (House)

Music
"The Itch", song and single by Kix Kix (album) 1981
The Itch (Vitamin C song) 2001	
"The Itch", by Keb' Mo' from Suitcase (Keb' Mo' album) 2006 
"The Itch" song by saxophonist Chuck Higgins
"The Itch", band from Stillwater, Minnesota circa 1991

Television
"The Itch", an episode of season 1 of Tom and Jerry Tales

See also
Itch (disambiguation)